Loretta Lynn Sings is the debut studio album by American country singer-songwriter Loretta Lynn. It was released on December 9, 1963 via Decca Records and was produced by Owen Bradley. The album contained songs recorded shortly after she had signed with the Decca label. In total, four singles were released from the album. Two of these singles became major hits on the Billboard country chart. This included "Success", which became Lynn's first top ten hit. The album was received positively by critics and writers alike.

Background and content
In 1960, Loretta Lynn had her first hit single with the self-penned "I'm a Honky Tonk Girl." She then moved to Nashville, Tennessee with her family to further establish her music career. Under the supervision and mentoring of The Wilburn Brothers, Lynn signed a new contract with the larger Decca Records. At the label, Lynn would have her breakthrough success and record her debut album. Loretta Lynn Sings was recorded in several sessions held between 1961 and 1963 in Nashville. Two locations were chosen for the studio sessions: the Bradley Studio and the Columbia Studio. The sessions were produced by Owen Bradley. It was Bradley who helped establish Lynn's musical sound at Decca, which further elevated her success in later years.

Loretta Lynn Sings contained a total of 12 tracks. Three of these tracks were composed by Lynn: "The Girl That I Am Now," "World of Forgotten People" and "Hundred Proof Heartache." Additional tracks on the album were composed by other songwriters, including Johnny Mullins and Cindy Walker. Of these songs, several of them were first recorded and made hits by other artists. The second track, "The Minute You're Gone," was first a pop hit by Cliff Richard. Another track, "Act Naturally," was first a number one country hit by Buck Owens. Additionally, "Color of the Blues" had been a hit for George Jones, while "Lonesome 7-7203" was cut first by Hawkshaw Hawkins.

Critical reception

Loretta Lynn Sings received positive reviews from music writers and critics. In a December 1963 issue of Billboard magazine, writers praised the album's material as well as Lynn's own singing. "Miss Lynn sings up a storm on this fine new album, on songs by herself and various other good country writers." In later years, Allmusic would give the release three out of five possible stars. Critic Jasmine Rochelle of Lula 1892 also reviewed the album and gave it a positive response. Rochelle believed that the album showed how Lynn was discovering her musical identity, yet chose quality material. Rochelle especially praised Lynn's cover of "Act Naturally." She also noted Lynn's self-penned "Hundred Proof Heartache," pointing to her potential as a country music songwriter. "All in all, this is a solid first album. No song feels out of place or unbelievable, and the compositional variances in complexity highlight Lynn’s superb vocal skills. The storytelling style is consistent and each song touching in its own way," Rochelle concluded.

Release and chart performance
Loretta Lynn Sings was first released on December 9, 1963 via Decca Records. It was Lynn's debut studio album. It was issued as a vinyl LP, containing six songs on each side of the record. The album charted the Billboard Top Country Albums survey between 1963 and 1964 and peaked at number two. It would be the first of many albums by Lynn to make the country albums list. Loretta Lynn Sings included four singles that had been released between 1961 and 1963. It first single was the track "I Walked Away from the Wreck." Released in November 1961, failed to chart any Billboard publications. The following year, "Success" was issued as the album's second single in April 1962. It peaked at number six on the Billboard Hot Country Singles chart, becoming Lynn's first top ten hit single. The self-composed "World of Forgotten People" was then released as a single in October 1962, but failed to chart. The fourth and final single release was "The Other Woman" in February 1963. The single became Lynn's third major hit in her career, peaking at number 13 on the Billboard country songs chart.

Track listing

Personnel
All credits are adapted from the liner notes of Loretta Lynn Sings.

Musical personnel
 Willie Ackerman – drums
 Harold Bradley – electric guitar
 Cecil Brower – fiddle
 Floyd Cramer – piano
 Buddy Harman – drums
 Don Helms – steel guitar
 Tommy Jackson – fiddle
 The Jordanaires – background vocals
 Loretta Lynn – lead vocals
 Grady Martin – electric guitar
 Bob Moore – bass
 Wayne Moss – electric guitar
 Teddy Wilburn – guitar

Technical personnel
 Hal Bauksbaum – photography
 Owen Bradley – producer

Chart performance

Release history

References

1963 debut albums
Albums produced by Owen Bradley
Decca Records albums
Loretta Lynn albums